The common punaré (Thrichomys apereoides), is a species of spiny rat endemic to Brazil.

Description
Like other members of the genus Thrichomys, but unlike all other species of spiny rat, common punarés have no spines, and instead have a thick pelt of soft fur, which also extends for the full length of the tail. The fur is greyish-brown over most of the body, with whitish underparts and ears. There are also three pairs of small white spots on the face; one each above and below the eyes, and one at the base of the ears.

On average, they weigh , although males are slightly larger than females. Females have four teats, with one pair just behind the forelegs, and another in front of the hips.

Distribution and habitat
The common punaré is found only in eastern Brazil, where it inhabits a belt of relatively open caatinga and cerrado vegetation between the Amazonian and Atlantic Forests. It is found from the coasts of Ceará and Rio Grande do Norte through all of the other states of the Northeast Region, and across much of Minas Gerais in the south. Within this region, it inhabits mainly dry and rocky habitats.

Although it was formerly thought that there were as many as five subspecies, some of these are now regarded as entirely separate species, and only two subspecies are still recognised:

 Thrichomys apereoides apereoides - southern part of range
 Thrichomys apereoides laurenteus - northern part of range

Behaviour and biology
Common punarés are active mainly around dawn, resting for the rest of the day in nests among rocky boulders, or taking temporary refuge in any available crevice. They are agile animals, easily able to clamber through rugged and rocky terrain, and are also able to climb trees.

They are herbivorous, and able to survive without drinking for at least eighteen days under laboratory conditions. In the wild, they can obtain additional water by eating prickly pear cactuses. They breed throughout the year, giving birth to a litter of, on average, three pups, after a gestation of about 97 days. They begin to eat solid food within a few hours of birth, but are not fully weaned until about 28 days of age.

References

Thrichomys
Mammals described in 1839